Peter Keeton Leisure (March 21, 1929 – September 17, 2013) was a United States district judge of the United States District Court for the Southern District of New York.

Education and career

Born in New York City, New York, Leisure received a Bachelor of Arts degree from Yale University in 1952 and attended Columbia Law School, but was in the United States Army Lieutenant, Artillery from 1953 to 1955. He received a Bachelor of Laws from the University of Virginia School of Law in 1958. He was in private practice in New York City from 1958 to 1961. He was an Assistant United States Attorney of the Southern District of New York from 1962 to 1966. He was in private practice in New York City from 1966 to 1984.

Federal judicial service

Leisure was nominated by President Ronald Reagan on May 25, 1984, to a seat on the United States District Court for the Southern District of New York vacated by Judge Milton Pollack. He was confirmed by the United States Senate on June 15, 1984, and received commission the same day. He assumed senior status on March 21, 1997, and took inactive senior status in 2010.

Death

Leisure died of complications of pneumonia on September 17, 2013, in Manhattan.

References

Sources
 

1929 births
2013 deaths
Lawyers from New York City
Yale University alumni
Columbia Law School alumni
University of Virginia School of Law alumni
Judges of the United States District Court for the Southern District of New York
United States district court judges appointed by Ronald Reagan
20th-century American judges
United States Army officers
Assistant United States Attorneys